Burretiodendron esquirolii is a species of flowering plant in the family Malvaceae. It is found in China, Myanmar, and Thailand. It is threatened by habitat loss.

References

esquirolii
Trees of China
Trees of Myanmar
Trees of Thailand
Vulnerable plants
Taxonomy articles created by Polbot